Kohra was an estate (taluqdari) of Oudh, British India.  The taluqdari was controlled by Bandhalgoti clan of Rajputs. Now it is part of Amethi district in Uttar Pradesh, India.

History 
Narwar Nagar was of Madhya Pradesh was the original place of this Taluq. Rajkumar Sodh Dev of Narwargarh established the kingdom of Amethi in 966 and became the first Raja of Amethi. Rajkumar Himmat Sah, the younger son of Raja Bikram Sah, his descendant, established Kohra (estate) on the day of Ganga Dussehra in 1636 and established Lord Chaturbhuj and Shiva temple as the first establishment, then built Kohra Fort, where he was crowned. Babu Himmat Sah was the founder and first ruler of Kohra.

Under British rule, Kohra was scene of numerous battles. Babu Bhoop Singh of Kohra (estate) had participated in the revolution of 1857. He was involved in the War of Awadh of 1857 and the siege of Lucknow residency and to stop Colonel Wroughton, he fought historical battles at Chanda, Amhat and Kadunala in Sultanpur district. His property was taken under the management of Court of Wards in 1859. The fort of Kohra was leveled in 1859 by order  government; its ruins are still to be seen, covered with picturesque clumps of bamboos. On order of Calcutta High Court, by government removed Court of Wards from Kohra in 1870. Later, the estate was ruled by Babu Shiv Datt Singh, who was succeeded by Babu Shiv Dayal Singh.

After India's independence on 15 August 1947, Kohra (Taluq) estate was merged in Dominion of India and later Republic of India. Babu Shiv Bahadur Singh (1923—1993) was the last ruler of Kohra, participated in the class boycott of Uday Pratap College, Varanasi in the Quit India Movement of 1942 and later donated two of his villages to the Bhoodan movement. After his death in 1993, his brother Babu Umanath Singh proceeded as incumbent titular of Kohra.

Ravindra Pratap Singh of the Kohra (estate) was elected an MP from Amethi Lok Sabha constituency in 1977 defeating Sanjay Gandhi and was elected as an MLA from Amethi Assembly constituency in 1967.

List of taluqdars styled as Raja 

 Babu Himmat Sah (fl.1636)
 Babu Anshuman Singh
 Babu Bhoop Singh (1840–1890)
 Babu Shiv Datt Singh
 Babu Shiv Dayal Singh 
 Babu Gambhir Singh
 Babu Beni Bahadur Singh
 Babu Shiv Bahadur Singh (1944–1993)
 Babu Umanath Singh (1993–2017)
 Babu Dr. Sanjay Singh (2017–Present)

Notable descendants 

 Babu Bhoop Singh (1820–1890), was prominent leader in the Indian Rebellion of 1857 and led a rebellion against the British forces in 1857.
 Bsbu Shiv Bahadur Singh (1923–1993), was a Freedom fighter.
 Babu Umanath Singh (1936–2017), was a Professor of Avadh University. He was a founding member of Uttar Pradesh History Congress.

See also 

 Kohra
 Amethi

References 

History of Uttar Pradesh
Zamindari estates
Amethi
Amethi district
Rajput estates